The Halifax-class frigate, also referred to as the City class, is a class of multi-role patrol frigates that have served the Royal Canadian Navy since 1992. The class is the outcome of the Canadian Patrol Frigate Project, which dates to the mid-1970s.  was the first of an eventual twelve Canadian-designed and Canadian-built vessels which combine traditional anti-submarine capabilities with systems to deal with surface and air threats as well. All ships of the class are named after a major city in each province (St. John's, Halifax, Charlottetown, Fredericton, Québec City, Toronto, Winnipeg, Regina, Calgary and Vancouver) plus the cities of Ottawa and Montreal.

In 2007, the Government of Canada announced a planned refit of the Halifax class which is known as the Halifax Class Modernization Project (HCMP) of which the Frigate Equipment Life Extension (FELEX) project is a part. In November 2008, a Lockheed Martin Canada-led team including Saab AB, Elisra, IBM Canada, CAE Professional Services, L-3 Electronic Systems and xwave, was awarded the contract. The construction phase of the program was completed in November 2016. , the Halifax-class modernization program is being closed out, but full operational capacity was reached on 31 January 2018.

In October 2011 the Canadian government launched the National Shipbuilding Procurement Strategy which aims to replace the Halifax class, as well as the capabilities of the s, with up to 15 new warships under the Canadian Surface Combatant. This replacement class is currently in the design stage and construction is anticipated to begin in the early 2020s. However, the Halifax-class vessels continue to be upgraded with at least some ships of the class anticipated as likely to continue service into the 2040s.

Description and design
In July 1983, the federal government approved the budget for the design and construction of the first batch of six frigates, with a second batch ordered in December 1987. To reflect the changing long-term strategy of the Navy during the 1980s and 1990s, the Halifax-class frigates was designed as a general purpose warship with particular focus on anti-submarine capabilities.

That made them slightly larger than the Iroquois-class destroyers. The vessels are propelled by two shafts with Escher Wyss controllable pitch propellers driven by a CODOG system of two General Electric LM2500 gas turbines, generating  and one SEMT Pielstick 20 PA6 V 280 diesel engine, generating .

The Halifax class has a complement of 198 naval personnel of which 17 are officers and 17 aircrew of which 8 are officers.

Control systems
The tactical command and control systems were developed in Canada. These included the Shipboard Integrated Communications System (SHINCOM), the Shipboard Integrated Machinery Control (SHINMACS), and Shipboard Integrated Integrated Processing and Display System (SHINPADS). 
SHINCOM was developed by DRS Technology Canada and was exported to other navies. SHINMACS was developed by CAE. SHINPADS was developed by Sperry Computer Systems in Winnipeg. with technical assistance from the United States. It used a revolutionary redundant and distributed computer architecture which was exported for use in US military control systems.

Armament and aircraft

As built the Halifax-class vessels deployed the CH-124 Sea King helicopter, which acted in concert with shipboard sensors to seek out and destroy submarines at long distances from the ships. The ships have a helicopter deck fitted with a "bear trap" system allowing the launch and recovery of helicopters in up to sea state 6. The Halifax class also carries a close-in anti-submarine weapon in the form of the Mark 46 torpedo, launched from twin Mark 32 Mod 9 torpedo tubes in launcher compartments on either side of the forward end of the helicopter hangar.

As built, the anti-shipping role is supported by the RGM-84 Harpoon Block 1C surface-to-surface missile, mounted in two quadruple launch tubes at the main deck level between the funnel and the helicopter hangar. For anti-aircraft self-defence the ships are armed with the Sea Sparrow vertical launch surface-to-air missile in two Mk 48 Mod 0 eight-cell launchers placed to port and starboard of the funnel. The vessels carry 16 missiles. A Raytheon/General Dynamics Phalanx Mark 15 Mod 21 Close-In Weapon System (CIWS) is mounted on top of the helicopter hangar for "last-ditch" defence against targets that evade the Sea Sparrow.

As built, the main gun on the forecastle is a /70 calibre Mark 2 gun from Bofors. The vessels also carry eight  machine guns.

Countermeasures and sensors
The torpedo decoy is the AN/SLQ-25A Nixie towed acoustic decoy from Argon ST. The ship's radar warning receiver, the CANEWS (Canadian Electronic Warfare System), SLQ-501, and the radar jammer, SLQ-505, were developed by Thorn and Lockheed Martin Canada.

Two Thales Nederland (formerly Signaal) SPG-503 (STIR 1.8) fire control radars are installed one on the roof of the bridge and one on the raised radar platform immediately forward of the helicopter hangar. The ship is also fitted with Raytheon AN/SPS-49(V)5 long-range active air search radar operating at C and D bands, Ericsson HC150 Sea Giraffe medium-range air and surface search radar operating at G and H bands, and Kelvin Hughes Type 1007 I-band navigation radar. The sonar suite includes the CANTASS Canadian Towed Array and GD-C AN/SQS-510 hull-mounted sonar and incorporates an acoustic range prediction system. The sonobuoy processing system is the GD-C AN/UYS-503.

Refit
The Government of Canada announced on 5 July 2007 a $3.1 billion refit program for the Halifax class which would take place from 2010 to 2018 and extend the ships' service lives through to the 2030s. 
The total cost of the program was set at $4.3 billion, with $2 billion for combat systems upgrades and $1.2 billion for mid-life refits. A further $1 billion was paid to contractors for other projects.

Faced with delays and restrictions from the International Traffic in Arms Regulations, the Navy opted to modernize the Halifax class using as much non-American equipment as possible, including technology from Canada, Sweden, Germany, Netherlands and Israel. The International Traffic in Arms Regulations has also been blamed for the delay of the CH-148 Cyclone which was running two years behind the original schedule. The Halifax class received state of the art equipment able to handle modern threats through 2030. The modernization includes passive and active weapons, radars, and new combat architecture.

The refit program was formally announced as completed on the west coast by Victoria Shipyards on 29 April 2016 by the Minister of National Defence Harjit Sajjan when Regina was returned to the Royal Canadian Navy.  the project was on budget. Calgary was the first to undergo work at Victoria, followed by Winnipeg, Ottawa and Regina. The construction phase of the program on the east coast was completed on 29 November 2016 when the final east coast ship, Toronto, was handed back to the Royal Canadian Navy at Halifax Shipyard.

Control systems
The new combat system architecture and combat management system is the CMS330 Combat Management System from Lockheed Martin Canada, which includes elements of the Saab  9LV Mk4 Combat Management System (known as the "CanACCS-9LV" suite of components.) CMS330 is a development of SHINPADS.

The Integrated Platform Management System (IPMS) from L-3 MAPPS provides systems management. IPMS is a development of SHINMACS.

Weaponry and propulsion upgrades

The Halifax class currently use the RIM-162 Evolved Sea Sparrow Missile (ESSM), instead of the obsolete RIM-7 Sea Sparrow. The ESSM gives a greater range against anti-ship missiles and enemy aircraft. BAE Systems received a contract to upgrade the Bofors 57 mm Mk 2 to Bofors 57 mm Mk 3 configuration. The upgrades were performed at Karlskoga between 2010 and 2016, before being installed in Halifax and Victoria.

The Department of National Defence requested a tender to provide a naval remote weapon system (NRWS) defence capability to the Halifax and Iroquois classes. The Halifax class was to be fitted with a new close-in weapon system (CIWS) to replace the 12.7 mm M2HB heavy machine gun. Although not part of the refit, Raytheon Canada Limited was awarded a contract of $180 million for eight years to overhaul, convert and repair all Canadian CIWS to a Block 1B Baseline 1 configuration.

It was announced by the Department of National Defence that Hewitt Equipment was chosen to replace the diesel generators aboard the Halifax-class vessels in June 2015. The contract was awarded for 10 years, with options to extend it out to 22 years and covers ships assigned to either coast. The speed of the vessels in the class increased to over  following the FELEX upgrades.

Sensors and countermeasures

As part of the refit, Thales Canada supplied the Sirius long-range Infrared Search and Track (IRST) for the Halifax class. The IRST is currently in use on board the German s. The IRST is able to track low radar cross-section aircraft and ships.

Saab provided 26 CEROS 200 Fire Control Directors. The CEROS 200 is a Radar and Optronic Tracking system which interfaces with advanced anti-ship missiles and gun systems. It provides defence against modern threats including modern sea skimming anti-ship missiles or asymmetric threats in littoral environments. The CEROS 200 is part of the 9LV Mk4.

The Halifax class were fitted with a modified Sea Giraffe SG-150 multi-function search radar. The SG-150 HC will be upgraded and will secure a high level of operational availability as well as improved functions. Thales supplied 13 Smart-S Mk2 S-band radars, including one for training purposes. These radars are optimized for medium-to-long-range search and target designation with a high degree of detection. The Smart-S Mk2 is a 3D multibeam radar which can detect hostile targets in near-shore environments. The deliveries began at the end of 2010 and were completed in 2015.

Raytheon Anschütz provided at least 12 Pathfinder ST MK 2 Radar systems. The Pathfinder Mark II is designed to provide a modern and flexible navigation tool. The Pathfinder ST Mk 2 radar system is part of the 9LV Mk4. In 2015, Canada acquired twelve sets of X and S-Band navigation radars from Raytheon Anschütz for the class. The new radars have advanced detection capability, new radiation control and pulse blanker interfaces and have improved interaction with the vessels' upgraded command and control system.

The Halifax class were fitted with the Multi Ammunition Softkill System (MASS) developed by Rheinmetall. MASS is a fully computerized countermeasure. The system is connected to the ship's sensors and protects ships from attacks by advanced, sensor-guided missiles by launching decoys that operate in all relevant wavelengths. MASS is currently in use by 15 other navies worldwide. Elbit Systems received a contract to supply Electronic Warfare equipment for the Halifax class, including active jamming and tracking systems.

Rheinmetall Waffe Munition GmbH received a contract to provide 14 Passive Electronic Countermeasures Systems (ECM).

Communications
The Halifax class received two Navy Multi-band Terminals (NMT), installed on the forward port and starboard sides of the hangar, to increase its satellite communications capabilities. The NMT system communicates with satellites in geostationary orbit via the Ka band. This system was augmented by the Maritime Satellite Communications Upgrade (MSCU), featuring the AN/USC-69(V3) antenna installed on the hangar top. The system was first used by the Halifax class on deployments to Operation Reassurance in 2012.

Ships in class

See also
 List of naval ship classes in service

 MEKO 200

Notes

References

Sources

External links

Canadian Navy of Yesterday & Today
Mk-48 Vertical Launching System (VLS)
Listing of FELEX changes 
Official ship websites:
Canadian Navy website – official site
Halifax-class frigates – official site

Frigate classes
Frigates of the Royal Canadian Navy
 
Naval ships of Canada